Three Summers is an Australian romantic comedy film, written and directed by Ben Elton.

It was filmed and is set in Western Australia, at a fictional summer music festival called 'Westival' (based on the real-life Fairbridge Festival). Over three consecutive years, two musicians (played by Rebecca Breeds and Robert Sheehan) meet and fall in love at the festival amidst a microcosm of Australian society. In addition to Breeds and Sheehan, the film has a large ensemble cast including Magda Szubanski, Michael Caton, Deborah Mailman, Jacqueline McKenzie and John Waters.

The film had its world premiere at the Melbourne International Film Festival on 12 August 2017, and was released nationally in Australia on 2 November.

Plot
The film's main plotline revolves around a blossoming romance between its two leads, pretentious theremin player Roland (Robert Sheehan) and down-to-earth pub band fiddler Keevy (Rebecca Breeds)

The film also has a subplot about a racist bigot (played by Michael Caton) meeting a refugee boy and a group of indigenous folk dancers and learns the error of his ways.

The film contains several running gags, revolving around feminist singer Diamond and her renditions of classic Australian songs and poems, two middle-aged couples who at first seem nice and clean but are actually swingers, a girl band trio vowing to stay together but then two of the three quit and a stern security guard who upholds the rules.

Cast
Robert Sheehan as Roland
Rebecca Breeds as Keevey
John Waters as Eamon
Deborah Mailman as Pam
Kelton Pell as Jack
Jacqueline McKenzie as Professor Wellborn 
Magda Szubanski as Queenie
Michael Caton as Henry

Production
Three Summers was filmed in the Peel region of Perth, Western Australia in 2016.

Reception
Review aggregator Rotten Tomatoes reported that 54% of critics reviewed the film positively, with an average score of 4.6/10, based on 13 reviews.

David Stratton of The Australian wrote, "The film is worth seeing for Waters, giving a spirited portrayal of a loving father set in his ways and unable to see that times are changing, and Breeds as his lively, talented, worldly wise daughter."

Conversely, Sandra Hall of the Sydney Morning Herald argued, "It's a relentlessly well-meaning film and when it's not proselytising, it's working very hard to manufacture enough laughs to make the whole mix palatable. However, the effort shows."

References

External links

2017 films
Australian romantic comedy films
Films set in Western Australia
2010s English-language films
Films with screenplays by Ben Elton
Films directed by Ben Elton
2017 romantic comedy films
Screen Australia films
Transmission Films films
2010s Australian films